The 2007–08 season 31st season of competitive association football in Australia since restructuring of domestic system.

National teams

Australia national soccer team

Results and fixtures

Friendlies

World Cup 2010 qualifying

Group 1
<onlyinclude>

Men's under-23

Friendlies
The following is a list of friendlies played by the men's senior national team in 2007–08.

2008 Summer Olympics – Men's Asian Qualifiers

Men's under-20

Friendlies
The following is a list of friendlies played by the men's senior national team in 2007–08.

2008 AFC U-19 Championship qualification

Men's under-17

Friendlies
The following is a list of friendlies played by the men's senior national team in 2007–08.

AFC U-16 Championship qualification

Women's senior

Results and fixtures

Friendlies

Women's World Cup 2007

Group C

Knockout stage

Women's Asian Cup 2008

Group B

Knockout stage

Women's under-20

Friendlies
The following is a list of friendlies played by the women's under-20 national team in 2007–08.

AFC U-19 Women's Championship

Women's under-17

Friendlies
The following is a list of friendlies played by the women's under-17 national team in 2007–08.

AFC competitions

AFC Champions League

Group stage

Group E

Group G

Knockout stage

Quarter-finals

Semi-finals

Final

Men's soccer

A-League

Cup competitions

Pre-Season Challenge Cup

Final

Retirements
 1 July 2007: Paul Okon, 35, former Marconi Stallions and Newcastle Jets midfielder.
 1 July 2007: Fernando Rech, 33, former Brisbane Strikers and Parramatta Power striker.
 1 January 2008: Brendan Renaud, 34, former Marconi Stallions, Parramatta Power, St George, Blacktown City and Sydney FC midfielder.
 1 February 2008: Craig Deans, 33, former Fremantle Spirit and Newcastle Jets centre-back.
 1 February 2008: Tony Vidmar, 37, former Adelaide City and Central Coast Mariners left-back.
 1 March 2008: Damien Brown, 33, former Central Coast Mariners, Canberra Cosmos, Parramatta Power and Newcastle Jets midfielder.
 21 April 2008: Stan Lazaridis, 35, former West Adelaide left midfielder.
 12 July 2008: Richie Alagich, 34, former West Adelaide, South Melbourne, Brisbane Strikers and Adelaide United right-back.

References

2007 in Australian soccer
2008 in Australian soccer
Seasons in Australian soccer